The Seattle Metropolitan Chamber of Commerce is a private, membership-based organization that represents economic development and the economic interests of its corporate members in the metro region of Seattle, Washington. Its members include most of the largest companies based in Seattle or have a significant presence there.

The Seattle Metropolitan Chamber of Commerce was founded on April 17, 1882 by 26 businessmen looking to capture a lucrative mail route to Alaska. Today, the Chamber is the largest network of influential businesses in the Puget Sound region. Members come from all industries, in all sizes, and from all over the Puget Sound region. The name of the organization was changed from Greater Seattle Chamber of Commerce in September 2011.

The Seattle Metropolitan Chamber's central purpose is to create and protect a competitive advantage for businesses in Seattle and the region. These efforts fall under three major categories: business leadership, business advocacy and business development.

See also 
 Los Angeles Chamber of Commerce
 Manhattan Chamber of Commerce

References

External links 
 The Seattle Metropolitan Chamber of Commerce

Archives
 Seattle Chamber of Commerce Records. 1929. 7 items.
 Seattle Chamber of Commerce Army Post Committee Records. 1896-1897. 1 volume.

Seattle metropolitan area
Chambers of commerce in the United States
Organizations based in Seattle